The Yaxa was a Swiss automobile produced from 1912 until 1914.  Its name was a phonetic rendering of the phrase  'Y a que ça ("It's the only one there is").  Of Genevan manufacture, the car was built by Charles Bahni, an early collaborator of Charles-Edouard Henriod.  The Yaxa was a 1692 cc light car which used a four-cylinder Zedel engine; among its other touches were central gear and brake levers.  Baehni drove a Yaxa to victory in the 1913 Coupe de la Gruyère; nevertheless, the marque folded a year later.

References
David Burgess Wise, The New Illustrated Encyclopedia of Automobiles.

Cars of Switzerland
Defunct motor vehicle manufacturers of Switzerland
Vehicle manufacturing companies established in 1912
Vehicle manufacturing companies disestablished in 1914
1912 establishments in Switzerland
1914 disestablishments in Switzerland